Sudanese coup d'état may refer to:

October 2021 Sudanese coup d'état
September 2021 Sudanese coup d'état attempt
2019 Sudanese coup d'état
2012 Sudanese coup d'état attempt
2004 Sudanese coup d'état attempt
1990 Sudanese coup d'état attempt
1989 Sudanese coup d'état
1985 Sudanese coup d'état
1977 Sudan Juba coup d'état attempt
1971 Sudanese coup d'état
1969 Sudanese coup d'état